Philip J. Lewis (November 28, 1900 – August 16, 1985) was a lawyer and politician in Newfoundland. He represented Harbour Main from 1928 to 1932 as a Liberal, Placentia and St. Mary's from 1932 to 1934 as a member of the United Newfoundland Party and Harbour Main-Bell Island from 1951 to 1971 as a Liberal in the Newfoundland and Labrador House of Assembly.

He was born in Holyrood, the son of John Lewis and Elizabeth Veitch, and was educated at Saint Bonaventure's College and Dalhousie University. Lewis was called to the Newfoundland bar in 1926 and set up practice in St. John's. He served in the Executive Council of Richard Squires as a minister without portfolio. Lewis married Ella Roche. In 1940, he was named King's Counsel. Lewis served in Joey Smallwood's cabinet as a minister without portfolio from 1951 to 1971. In 1971, he left politics and continued to practice law, retiring shortly before his death in St. John's in 1985.

References 

Liberal Party of Newfoundland and Labrador MHAs
1900 births
1985 deaths
United Newfoundland Party MHAs